Åke is a masculine Swedish given name, possibly derived from the medieval Germanic name Anicho, derived from ano meaning "ancestor". In Sweden, May 8 is the Name day for Åke. There are variant spellings, including the Danish/Norwegian Åge or Aage. Åke is uncommon as a surname. People with the name Åke include:

Åke Bergqvist (1900–1975), Swedish Olympic sailor
Åke Borg (1901–1973), Swedish swimmer
Åke Edwardson (born 1953), Swedish author of detective fiction, and a professor at Gothenburg University
Åke Fridell (1919–1985), Swedish film actor
Åke Green (born 1941), Swedish Pentecostal Christian pastor
Åke Gustafsson (1908–1988), Swedish botanist and geneticist
Åke Häger (1897–1968), Swedish Olympic gymnast
Åke Hedvall (1910–1969), Swedish discus thrower
Åke Hellman (1915–2017), Finnish centenarian, art professor and painter
Åke Hellman (born 1940), Swedish accordionist
Åke Hodell (1919–2000), Swedish fighter pilot, poet, author, text-sound composer, and artist
Åke Jonsson (born 1942), Swedish motocross racer
Åke Kromnow (1914–1986), Swedish archivist
Åke Lindman (formerly Åke Järvinen) (1928–2009), Finnish director and actor
Åke Lundqvist (1936–2021), Swedish actor
Åke Mangård (1917–1998), Swedish Air Force major general
Åke Nauman (1908–1995), Swedish Olympic water polo player
Åke Nordin (1936–2013), Swedish entrepreneur
Åke Ortmark (1929–2018), Swedish journalist, author and radio and television presenter
Åke Parmerud (born 1953), Swedish electroacoustic music composer
Åke Pleijel (1913–1989), Swedish mathematician
Åke Pousette (born 1949), Swedish andrologist
Åke Rusck (1912–1977), Swedish businessman
Åke Seyffarth (1919–1998), Swedish speed skater
Åke Sundborg (1921–2007), Swedish geomorphologist and hydrologist
Åke Thelning (1892–1979), Swedish Olympic horse rider
Åke Henriksson Tott (1598–1640), Swedish soldier and politician
Åke Wallenquist (1904–1994), Swedish astronomer
Karl-Åke Asph (born 1939), Swedish Olympic cross country skier
Bengt-Åke Gustafsson (born 1958), retired Swedish ice hockey player, now head coach of the Swedish national ice hockey team
Lars-Åke Lagrell (1940–2020), Swedish sports personality; President of the Swedish Football Association
Sven-Åke Lundbäck (born 1948), Swedish Olympic cross-country skier

References

Swedish masculine given names